Pavlina Ivanovna Filipova;  born December 20, 1975 in Berkovitsa) is a Bulgarian biathlete. Her professional sporting career began in 1996. She has competed in three Winter Olympic Games. In 1998 and 2002, Filipova posted fourth-place finishes in the 15 km individual and 4 x 7.5 km relay, respectively. Filipova also won an individual gold medal for Bulgaria in the 15 km race at the 2006 Biathlon European Championships in Langdorf-Abersee, Germany. In the same year she was awarded a golden badge by the Bulgarian Olympic Committee. Filipova is married and has a daughter, called Adriana.

Titles 
 World Cup
No victories in World Cup events. Twice finished 3rd
15th in general classification in 1999-2000 World Cup

References

1975 births
Living people
Bulgarian female biathletes
People from Berkovitsa
Olympic biathletes of Bulgaria
Biathletes at the 1998 Winter Olympics
Biathletes at the 2002 Winter Olympics
Biathletes at the 2006 Winter Olympics
21st-century Bulgarian women